Siadhail (d 813) was Abbot  and possibly Bishop of Roscommon in the 9th century:

Notes

813 deaths
9th-century Irish bishops
Bishops of Roscommon